Bihorel is a commune of the Seine-Maritime department in the Normandy region in northern France. It is a northeastern suburb of Rouen.

Geography

Situation 
Bihorel is a suburban and light industrial town forming part of the agglomeration of Rouen. 
Located on the northern plateau of Rouen, Bihorel is a town with three districts:
Vieux Bihorel: attached to Rouen, halfway up the slope;
plateau des Provinces : the neighborhood of collective buildings behind old Bihorel;
le Chapitre: the residential neighborhood further north.

Roads and transportation 
Bihorel is situated at the junction of the D243 and the D443 roads. The T2 line (TEOR) permits to reach the city center of Rouen in 30 minutes from the south of Bihorel. The F2, 40 and 20 lines make possible to go to the city center of Rouen in 10 minutes.

Heraldry

History 
The town was created on April 13, 1892. Previously, Bihorel was a district of Bois-Guillaume.

On 4 July 2011, the merger of Bihorel and Bois-Guillaume was voted in the municipal councils, a merger that was effective from January 1, 2012, under the regime of the new municipalities, despite the consultation organized by the mayors of these two cities. There was a very large opposition from the population (66.43% opposed).

From January 1, 2012 to December 31, 2013, the municipality was merged with its neighbor, Bois-Guillaume, as the commune nouvelle Bois-Guillaume-Bihorel. The creation of this commune was invalidated by the administrative court of Rouen, a decision neither the prefecture or the municipality appealed. The two municipalities were recreated on 1 January 2014.

Population

Places of interest
 The church of Notre-Dame, dating from the nineteenth century.
 A seventeenth century manor house.

Notable people
 Jules Michelet (1798–1874) historian, stayed here many times.
 Charles Nicolle (1866–1936) scientist, had a house here.

Twin towns

 Uelzen, Germany
 Soar Valley, England
 Baix Camp, Spain
 Torgiano, Italy
 Wejherowo, Poland

See also
Communes of the Seine-Maritime department

References

External links

Official websitel 

Communes of Seine-Maritime